Peter Holl (born 29 January 1955) is a German former professional tennis player.

A native of Cologne, Holl took up the sport of tennis at the age of seven and in 1975 joined the tennis team at Georgia Southern College, where he played for two seasons.

Holl featured in doubles main draws at two editions of the French Open, in 1980 and 1981. His best performance was a second round appearance in the men's doubles at the 1980 French Open, partnering Tsuyoshi Fukui.

References

External links
 
 

1955 births
Living people
West German male tennis players
Tennis players from Cologne
Georgia Southern Eagles athletes
German male tennis players
College men's tennis players in the United States